Sir Richard Cotton (in or before 1497 – 1556), was a courtier in the court of Henry VIII of England. He came from Shropshire and began his career as a lawyer before entering the king's service. His elder brother George Cotton was in charge of the household of the king's son Henry, Duke of Richmond at Sheriff Hutton Castle, and Richard served there as comptroller. The king granted him property in Bedhampton, Hampshire and Bourne, Lincolnshire.
He became privy councillor in May 1552. He was knight of the shire for Hampshire in 1553 and Cheshire in 1554.

References
 
 Birkbeck, J.D. A History of Bourne.(1976)
 Davies, Catharine. Oxford Dictionary of National Biography

1490s births
1556 deaths
Year of death unknown
Year of birth uncertain
Politicians from Shropshire
People from Bourne, Lincolnshire
English MPs 1553 (Edward VI)
English MPs 1554–1555
Members of the Privy Council of England
People from the Borough of Havant
Household of Henry Fitzroy